Two ships of the Royal Australian Navy (RAN) have been named HMAS Maryborough, after the city of Maryborough, Queensland

, a Bathurst-class corvette commissioned in 1941, decommissioned in 1945, and sold into private ownership in 1947
, an Armidale-class patrol boat commissioned in 2007 and active as of 2016

Battle honours
Ships named HMAS Maryborough are entitled to carry three battle honours:
 Pacific 1942
 Indian Ocean 1942–44
 Sicily 1943

References

Royal Australian Navy ship names